The Office of Disaster Preparedness and Emergency Management (formerly known as the ODIPERC or Office of Disaster Preparedness and Emergency Relief Coordination) is the Jamaican disaster preparedness coordinating body, which is responsible for preventing and reducing impact of hazards. It also coordinates responses to inter-island disasters with the Caribbean Disaster Emergency Response Agency.

History 
On June 11, 1979, the Tropical Depression One brought intense flooding to Jamaica. Recognizing the need for a disaster preparedness and relief organization, the Government of Jamaica established the ODIPERC on June 1980 to provide relief and prepare Jamaica for future disasters.

In 1993, the name ODIPERC was made into a statuary body and was renamed to ODPEM.

References

Ministries and agencies of the government of Jamaica